Sengar is a surname. Notable people with the surname include:

Kratika Sengar, Indian actress
Kuldeep Singh Sengar (1966), Indian politician

Hindustani-language surnames
Surnames of Hindustani origin